Heaven or Vegas was a 1996 movie which was a romantic drama that starred Yasmine Bleeth and Richard Grieco.

Plot

Rachel (Yasmine Bleeth) is a woman looking for a way out of her dead-end existence. Six years after she ran away from her home in Utah, Rachel is living in Las Vegas, where she works as an exotic dancer and an occasional call girl.

Rachel lives in a fantasy world as a way of distancing herself
from her bleak surroundings, and she imagines that a Prince
Charming will one day rescue her from her fallen world. On the
inside she is still a dreamy little girl who believes in fairy
tales. She thinks that her prince may have finally arrived when
she meets Navy (Richard Grieco), a high-class stud-for-sale who
has tired of his humiliating life in the sex industry.

Navy is fond of Rachel, and when he decides to leave male
prostitution behind and move to Montana to start a new life,
she eagerly joins him. However, along the way she persuades him to
make a stop in Utah so that she can check in with her family.
Rachel and Navy discover that it's difficult to hide their
respective pasts from Rachel's straightlaced family and that
they're out of step with life in small town America.

Navy also
finds himself attracted to Rachel's gorgeous and "virginal"
stepsister, Lilli (Monica Potter), which leads a heartbroken
Rachel to run away just as Navy realizes that Rachel is the one
for him. Rachels sister Paige runs away looking for her and is taken hostage along with Rachel by drifters. Navy and Billy dramatically rescue them from the  psychotic drifters. Later Rachel and Navy move to Montana to start their life together and they have two Sons.

Cast

Production credits

Gregory C. Haynes (Director and Writer)
Shane Walker (Associate Producer)
Cineville - Storm Entertainment (Production Company)

Trivia

Yasmine Bleeth and Richard Grieco, who both starred in this movie, also dated each other.

External links

1996 films
1990s English-language films